K1 De Ultimate (born Wasiu Omogbolahan Olasunkanmi Adewale Ayinde Marshal , 3 March 1957), is a Nigerian Fuji musician. He popularized  a brand of the fuji genre based on the work of the fuji creator Ayinde Barrister known as Talazo fuji that appeals to all age groups, irrespective of tribe and background.

Background
The King of Fuji Music: Olasunkanmi Ayinde Marshal,
K1 De Ultimate discovered his interest in music when he was 8. His parents initially opposed but he continued to pursue his passion and by the time he was 15 he had won various local musical competitions. He later became member of Ayinde Barrister's band, the Supreme Fuji Commanders from 1975 to 1978 after previously serving under him as instrument packer. He also adopted the name of Ayinde into his name after seeking the permission and blessing of his master Ayinde Barrister. He released his first album titled Iba with the special track 'Abode Mecca' in 1980, and thereafter, his most successful album Talazo '84 in 1984. He has won many titles and several music awards.

Music career 
K1 De Ultimate began his global tour between North America and Europe in 1986 and performed at Hammersmith Town Hall in 1987. That was followed by New York city, United States with full Talazo Band on Sep. 28 1990, London Yuppie 1 & 2 Nights 1991/92, European Tour 1995, Berlin 1997, North America (USA & Canada '98), Canada 2000, and USA Tour 2003. He has continued non stop touring annually since. In 1995 he delivered the first Fuji performance ever at  WOMAD Festival. He is also the only Fuji musician to perform at Troxy, WOMEX and SOB's.

Chieftaincy titles and Awards

 Badabarawu of Ogijo in 1985
 Ekerin Amuludun of Ibadanland in 1986
 Golden Mercury of Africa Title in 1986,
 Honoris Causa of Music at Saint John University Bakersfield California USA in 1989.
 Crown as King of Fuji, (Oluaye Fuji Music) at NTA Ibadan in 1993.
 The Oluomo of Lagos by King Adeyinka Oyekan of Lagos in 1999 
 On Monday, January 13, 2020, he was installed by the Alaafin of Oyo, Oba Lamidi Adeyemi as the first Mayegun of Yorubaland. Merit Award title M.O.N member of other Niger by president Muhammad Buhari on 11 October 2022,this page Arrange and list by Gani Olawale Sodiq Tgaine

Discography 
 King wasiu Ayinde Marshal M.O.N
Studio albums listed by Gani Olawale Sodiq Tgaine)
1980: Iba   (TGaine)
1981: Esi Oro (TGaine)
1982: Igbalaye (TGaine)
1984: Talazo System (TGaine)
1984: Talazo '84  (TGaine)
1984: Ise L'Ogun Ise  (TGaine)
1984: Ijo olomo  (TGaine)
1985: Talazo Disco 85 (TGaine)
1985: Alhaji Chief Wasiu Ayinde Barrister and His Talazo Fuji Commanders Organisation Oloriki Metta / Ki De Se [p] Vinyl LP Leader Record / LRC (LP) 05 (TGaine)
1985: Elo-Sora (TGaine)
1985: Pomposity (TGaine)
1986: Ori   (TGaine)
1986: Tiwa Dayo  (TGaine)
1986: Erin Goke - Lecture (TGaine)
1986: Baby Je Kajo (TGaine)
1987: Talazo In London (TGaine)
1987: Aiyé (TGaine)
1987: Adieu Awolowo (TGaine)
1988: Sun - Splash (TGaine)
1988: Fuji Headline (TGaine)
1988: My Dear Mother (TGaine)
1989: Fuji Rapping–– (TGaine)
1989: Achievement (TGaines)
1990: Jo Fun Mi (Dance For Me) (TGaine)
1991: American Tips
1991: Fuji Collections (TGaine)
1993: The Ultimate (TGaine)
1995: Consolidation (TGaine)
1995: Reflection (TGaine)
1995: Talazo Fuji Party Music Compact Disk (TGaine)
1996: Legacy (TGaine)
1996: Faze 2 Global Tour '96 (TGaine)
1997: History (Edited By TGaine)
1997: Berlin Compact Disk (TGaine)
1999: Fuji Fusion (Okofaji Carnival) (TGaine)
2000: New Era (TGaine)
2000: Faze 3 (TGaine)
2001: Message (TGaine)
2001: Statement (TGaine)
2001: New Lagos (TGaine)
2002: Gourd  (TGaine)
2003: Big Deal (TGaine)
2006: Flavour  (TGaine)
2011: Tribute To My Mentor (TGaine)
2012: Instinct (TGaine)
2012: Fuji Time (TGaine)
2017: 22 Dec Fuji Ep Let Music Flow (TGaine)
2020 Fuji The Sound Fuji Hip ( Gani Olawale Sodiq, tgaine)
2022 Timeless ( Gani Olawale Sodiq Tgaine)

Hit Live Play (Listed By Gani Olawale Sodiq, TGaine)
1984: Talazo System
1984: Omo Akorede
1986: Golden Mercury
1989: Siliky
1990: American Tour Live
1991: Yuppie Night 1 n 2
1994: Consolidation live Ade Bendel
1995: Sabaka Night
1995: Oju Opon 
1995: Fadaka Club
1995: London Hamburg Amsterdam Berlin 95
1997: London Hamburg Amsterdam Berlin Paris 97
1998: United Kingdom Live
1998: New York Chicago Atlanta Houston & Canada Tour Toronto Montreal live 1998
1999: New Era Live United Kingdom
1999: Afinni
2000: Canada live 
2007: United Kingdom Ireland Tour Live
2007: The Truth Live
And Many More Hit Live
Eko for show USA 1990
Concert
1995 Womad Concert
1997 Benson & Hedges
1999 Benson & Hedges Loud in Lagos
2020 Fuji the Sound ep

Awards

|-
|2013
|K1 De Ultimate
|The Headies | Hall Of Fame
|
|-
|2014
|K1 De Ultimate
|City People Lifetime Achievement Award
|
|-

References

1957 births
20th-century Nigerian musicians
Living people
Nigerian male musicians
Musicians from Ogun State
Yoruba musicians
World music musicians
Nigerian bandleaders
Musicians from Lagos
Yoruba-language singers
20th-century male musicians